Charles Stroud may refer to:

 Charles Eric Stroud (1924–2005), Welsh paediatrician and professor
 Charles C. Stroud (1870–1949), American football, basketball, and baseball coach